Anders Kraupp (born 3 September 1959 in Stockholm, Sweden) is a Swedish curler and curling coach. He competed at two Winter Olympics (2002, 2006).

In 2013 he was inducted into the Swedish Curling Hall of Fame.

Teams

Men's

Mixed

Mixed doubles

Record as a coach of national teams

Personal life

He started playing curling in 1978 when he was 19 years old.

References

External links
 
 

Living people
1959 births
Sportspeople from Stockholm
Swedish male curlers
Olympic curlers of Sweden
Curlers at the 2006 Winter Olympics
Curlers at the 2002 Winter Olympics
World curling champions
European curling champions
Swedish curling champions
Swedish curling coaches